Volodymyr Kaliuzhniy (born 5 July 1972) is a Ukrainian fencer. He competed in the sabre events at the 1996, 2000 and 2004 Summer Olympics.

References

External links
 

1972 births
Living people
Ukrainian male sabre fencers
Olympic fencers of Ukraine
Fencers at the 1996 Summer Olympics
Fencers at the 2000 Summer Olympics
Fencers at the 2004 Summer Olympics
Sportspeople from Kyiv